Thomas Miller may refer to:

Politicians

Thomas Miller (North Carolina governor) (died 1685), governor in 1677
Thomas Miller, Lord Glenlee (1717–1789), Scottish politician and judge, Member of Parliament 1761–1766
Thomas B. Miller (1896–1976), U.S. Representative from Pennsylvania
Thomas E. Miller (1849–1938), U.S. Representative from South Carolina
Thomas H. Miller (Iowa newspaperman) (1925–2001), Iowa politician and newspaper editor
Thomas Miller (Saskatchewan) (1876–1945), Lieutenant-Governor of Saskatchewan in 1945
Thomas W. Miller (1886–1973), U.S. Representative from Delaware
Thomas John Miller (born 1944), State Attorney General of Iowa
Thomas V. Miller Jr. (1942–2021), president of the Maryland State Senate
Thomas J. Miller (diplomat) (born 1948), former U.S. Ambassador to Greece
Sir Thomas Miller, 1st Baronet, of Chichester (1635–1705), MP for Chichester 1689–1695
Sir Thomas Miller, 3rd Baronet (c. 1689–1733), MP for Chichester 1715–1727
Sir Thomas Miller, 5th Baronet (1731–1816), MP for Lewes 1774–1778 and Portsmouth 1806–1816

Sports
Thomas Miller (footballer, born 1963), German footballer
Thomas Miller (Scottish footballer), Scottish footballer
Thomas Miller (Queen's Park footballer), Scottish footballer
Thomas Miller (Rangers footballer), Scottish footballer
Thomas Miller (cricketer) (1883–1962), English cricketer
Tommy Miller (born 1979), English footballer
Tommy Miller (footballer, born 1883) (1883–?), Scottish footballer

Others
Thomas Miller (bookseller) (1731–1804), English bookseller
Thomas Miller (poet) (1807–1874), English poet and novelist
Thomas Miller (pastor) (born 1970), leader of Gateway Worship
Thomas Miller (visual artist) (1920–2012), creator of the founders' mosaics at the DuSable Museum, Chicago
Thomas Miller (bassist), bassist of Symphony X
Thomas H. Miller (1923–2007), United States Marine Corps Naval Aviator and test pilot
Sir Thomas Miller, 6th Baronet (1781–1864), Church of England clergyman
Thomas G. Miller, Commander United States First Army
Thomas Francis Miller (1863–1939), American architect
Thomas I. Miller, American academic administrator and accountant
Thomas Maskew Miller (1863–1926), South African bookseller and publisher
Tommy Miller, a character in the film Ah, Wilderness!
Tommy Miller, a character in the video game The Last of Us and the TV series

See also
Tom Miller (disambiguation)
Thomas Millar (1925–1994), Australian historian and political scientist